B.P. Marine is a maritime training academy located at Navi Mumbai.

Introduction 
It is approved by the Directorate General of Shipping of the Government of India's Ministry of Surface Transport. 
It also offers Higher Nautical Diploma training programs in collaboration with South Tyneside College & City of Glasgow College, approved by Maritime and Coastguard Agency (M.C.A) Govt. of UK.

Courses 
The institute conducts streams of fully residential courses & several other modular courses (STCW courses)

Ø GP Rating (Lower Nautical Diploma)

Ø Certificate Course in Maritime Catering (CCMC)

Ø Electro Technical Officer course (ETO)

Ø BSc in Nautical Science

Ø Deck-Cadet Higher Nautical Diploma in Nautical science

Ø Engine-Cadet Higher Nautical Diploma in Marine Engineering

Ø BSc in Hospitality/Hotel Management

See also
Training Ship Chanakya
Pakistan Marine Academy

Sources

1997 establishments in Maharashtra
Maritime colleges in India
Education in Navi Mumbai